Ah, Wilderness! is a comedy by American playwright Eugene O'Neill that premiered on Broadway at the Guild Theatre on October 2, 1933. It differs from a typical O'Neill play in its happy ending for the central character, and depiction of a happy family in turn of the century America.  It is O'Neill's only well-known comedy.

The play was successful in its first Broadway production and the touring production that followed. It has since become a staple of community repertory.

Theme
The play takes place on the Fourth of July 1906 and focuses on the Miller family, presumably of New London, Connecticut. The main plot deals with the middle son, 16-year-old Richard, and his coming of age in turn-of-the-century America. "Perhaps the most atypical of the author's works, the play presents a sentimental tale of youthful indiscretion in a turn-of-the-century New England town."

Title
The title derives from Quatrain XII of Edward Fitzgerald's translation of the Rubáiyát of Omar Khayyám (5th edition, 1889), one of Richard's favorite poems:

A Book of Verses underneath the Bough,
A Jug of Wine, a Loaf of Bread—and Thou
Beside me singing in the Wilderness—
Oh, Wilderness were Paradise enow!

Opening night credits

Theatre Guild Producer
Philip Moeller Director
Robert Edmond Jones Scenic Designer
CAST
George M. Cohan as Nat Miller 
Adelaide Bean as Mildred Miller 
John Butler as Salesman 
Ruth Chorpenning as Norah 
Elisha Cook, Jr. as the son, Richard Miller 
Ruth Gilbert as Muriel McComber 
Eda Heinemann as Lily Miller 
Ruth Holden as Belle 
Gene Lockhart as Sid Davis 
Marjorie Marquis as David's mother, Essie Miller 
Donald McClelland as Bartender 
William Post, Jr. as Arthur Miller 
Richard Sterling as David McComber 
Walter Vonnegut, Jr. as Tommy Miller 
John Wynne as Wint Selby

When the play first toured, Will Rogers took the role of the warmhearted Nat, perhaps contributing to the critical and audience success of the play, a staple of community repertory since the original production.

Reception
The play was included in Burns Mantle's The Best Plays of 1933–1934 with George M. Cohan in the cast and again as a revival in 1941–42.

In a review of a 1998 production of the play at The Huntington Theatre in Boston, the reviewer noted O'Neill, who "penned [it] in a single month in 1932, the Harvard educated playwright takes a well deserved vacation from this cold and unrelenting world, and gives us a surprisingly warm portrayal of middle-class family life in "large small-town America."" He further remarked about the play "The character Richard Miller was clearly modeled on O'Neill's image of himself as an aspiring poet, but unlike O'Neill, Richard's rebellion is quelled and his craving for romantic endeavors extinguished by a loving family who cares and wishes him the best."

Adaptations

The play was made into a 1935 film of the same title and again in 1948 as the musical Summer Holiday. Mickey Rooney starred as Tommy in the former and Richard in the latter.  The success of the first film led MGM to reunite much of the cast in another film based on a small town coming of age play, A Family Affair, which became the basis for the Andy Hardy series.

The play was also adapted for radio on The Campbell Playhouse produced by and starring Orson Welles on September 17, 1939. It was also adapted for Theatre Guild On The Air on October 7, 1945, The Ford Theatre on November 2, 1947, and Studio One on July 15, 1948.

On June 15, 1955, a televised adaptation was shown on Front Row Center on CBS.  

The story was also made into the 1959 Broadway musical Take Me Along starring Jackie Gleason as the drunken Uncle Sid (Beery's role in the film), Walter Pidgeon as Nat and Robert Morse as Richard. The production ran for 448 performances. Gleason won the 1960 Tony Award for Best Actor in a Musical. A revival in 1984 had a successful run for six months in Connecticut and Washington, D.C. but closed on Broadway after only a short debut and a week of previews.

References

Further reading

External links

 Ah, Wilderness! production archive  at eONeill.com
 
 
 
 
 Photos of a production of Ah, Wilderness!
1954 Theatre Guild on the Air radio adaptation of original play at Internet Archive

1933 plays
American plays adapted into films
Broadway plays
Comedy plays
Fiction set in 1906
Independence Day (United States) plays
Plays by Eugene O'Neill
Plays set in the 1900s